Þorlákur (Old Norse: Þorlákr) is an Icelandic given name, meaning "game of Thor". Notable people with this name include:
 Þorlákur Runólfsson (1086–1133), Icelandic bishop
 Þorlákur helgi Þórhallsson (1133–1193), Icelandic bishop and saint
  (died 1303), Icelandic lawman
  (died 1354), Icelandic abbot
 Þorlákur Skúlason (1597–1656), Icelandic bishop
  (1675–1697), schoolmaster in Skálholt

Icelandic masculine given names